The College of Arts and Sciences, the largest of the 16 colleges at Florida State University, contains the majors of nearly 11,000 students and is made up of 18 departments, nine interdisciplinary programs, and 14 centers, programs and institutes. Nearly 2,600 degrees are issued to graduates each academic year. There is currently a faculty-to-student ratio of 22:1 and 50 percent of the Arts and Sciences faculty and TAs who teach nearly half of all credit hours. The college encompasses the fields of social sciences, liberal arts, mathematics, sciences and interdisciplinary studies. National and international recognition have been given to faculty for their teaching, research, and hard work to the profession. In addition, Martin Luther King Jr. Distinguished Scholar Awards, University Teaching and Advising Awards, and Developing scholar Awards have been awarded to 125 faculty members at the Arts and Sciences college.

History

The College of Arts and Sciences is the oldest college at the university, having existed since 1905. Though it has awarded bachelor's degrees since its founding, the first master's degree was not offered until 1908. The next year, the university, then called the Florida Female College, was renamed Florida State College for Women and issued its first master's degree under that name in 1909. Doctorates were given out by the College of Arts and Sciences beginning in 1952.

The college is housed in several buildings including Dodd Hall, the Bellamy Building, the Psychology Building and the Williams Building. The dean of the College of Arts and Sciences is located in the Longmire Building.

In July 2011, Quinn Huckaba, previously associate dean of the College of Arts and Sciences, became interim dean. He then was formally named dean in October 2012.

National rankings

U.S. News & World Report (2020 Edition)
 Overall - 55th among national universities
 Clinical Psychology - 27th overall
 Physics - 53rd overall
 Chemistry - 49th overall
 Psychology - 62nd overall
 Math - 70th overall
 Earth Sciences - 62nd overall
 English - 62nd overall
 Biological Sciences - 80th overall

In 2015, the online computer science bachelor's degree program was ranked 1st among both public and private universities by BestColleges.com

Department of History
The first master's degree was awarded in 1927 and the first PhD in 1962.

The Department of History includes faculty in Napoleonic history, Eastern European history, war and society, history of science, Latin American/Caribbean history, and Atlantic world history. Faculty members include Robert Gellately, the Earl Ray Beck Professor of History.

Biological sciences
The Department of Biological Science includes faculty in cellular and molecular biology, computational biology, evolution and ecology, and neuroscience to guide students earning their MS or PhD.  In 2008, the James E. King Life Sciences Building opened, giving the Department of Biological Science a new home. Numerous careers can stem from this Department as it provides diverse undergraduate programs for biomedical sciences, biotechnology, neuroscience, marine science, conservation, and environmental biology. This department conducts a number of labs so students are able to conduct research and publish their papers for scientific review with opportunities to earn rewards and scholarships from them.

Chemistry and biochemistry

Research in the Department of Chemistry and Biochemistry ranges from analytical through organic.

A five-story  Chemistry Building opened on May 2, 2008.

Also having worked in the field of materials science and nanoscience at FSU is the Nobel laureate Sir Harry Kroto, the co-discoverer of the C60 "buckyball", who retired from FSU's Department of Chemistry and Biochemistry in 2015.

Taxol — anti-cancer drug
A significant achievement at the university was chemistry professor and synthetic organic chemist Robert A. Holton's synthesizing of tamoxifen on December 9, 1993. The synthesized version, Taxol, has been used as an effective breast cancer and ovarian cancer treatment.

Holton and his organic chemistry team won a race to develop a cheaper semisynthetic version (Holton Taxol total synthesis). In 1993, Bristol-Myers Squibb began marketing Taxol, ultimately earning more than $1.6 billion by the year 2000.

Before the drug company's exclusive license expired, Florida State earned $351 million in royalties. In addition, polymer chemist and professor, Joseph Schlenoff, holds 30 patents relating to his research into multilayers and hydrogels.

English
The Department of English at FSU is a nationally ranked program that encompasses many majors and produces a number of journals such as the Kudzu Review, The Southeast Review, and The Journal of Early Modern Studies. Comprising a wide range of topics, the faculty include winners of Guggenheim, National Endowment for the Arts, Fulbright, and Newberry Library fellowships.

Earth, Ocean and Atmospheric Science

Meteorology

Founded in 1949, the FSU meteorology program is the largest and most complete meteorology program in the southeastern United States, with 17 faculty members, over 85 graduate students and approximately 200 undergraduate students.

Physics

The Department of Physics, comprising more than 60 faculty and over 100 graduate students, is a major research department, offering graduate programs that have been ranked amongst the best in the nation by U.S. News & World Report.

In terms of major facilities, the department has its own superconducting linear particle accelerator at which experiments ranging from precision atomic measurements to analysis of rare-isotope collisions are performed. The department maintains active groups working on experiments at Fermilab, CERN, Brookhaven National Laboratory, TJNAF, Argonne National Laboratory, and several others. Indirectly, through current director Dr. Gregory Boebinger as well as his predecessor, laboratory founder Dr. Jack Crow, the department operates the main complex of the multi discipline National High Magnetic Field Laboratory, located near campus at FSU's Innovation Park.

Psychology

FSU's Psychology Department has served as an education and research institution in the university for more than 100 years and has the distinction of being the first psychological laboratory in Florida. Founded in 1902, the program now offers over one hundred courses each semester and has nearly 70 faculty members. The department chair is Jeanette Taylor, Ph.D.

The department is the center of research in many areas with more than 30 research laboratories and $2 million in new grants being awarded in 2015. In 2020, PhD program in clinical psychology was ranked 27th by U.S. News & World Report and the department itself was ranked 60th.

Department of Military Science (Army ROTC) 

The Army ROTC teaches leadership through hands-on experience. Students can try out for this college elective in any given grade. The students also will not be required to serve; however, if they do choose this track, they will continue to MS-III and MS-IV to be commissioned as a Second Lieutenant in the United States Army, National Guard, or the Army Reserves. Many Scholarships are accessible through this course at the Art and Sciences College.

Department of Scientific Computing 
Department focuses on Computational Science which uses software, networks, computers and algorithms to solve problems, build things, do simulations, and gain additional information. It also allows students to get an MS degree in Interdiscipinary Data Science and a major in Scientific Computing. The Department includes instructors with the titles of biologists, computer scientists, hydrologists, material scientists, mathematicians, and physicists. One of the departments recent projects created by iSensor Lab is a mobile app called "CV19 Self Defense". They also offer a Ph.D. in Computational Science, a M.S. in Computational Science, Minor in Computational Science, P.H.D. in Fire Dynamics, and a Ph.D. in Geophysical Fluid Dynamics.

References

External links

Liberal arts colleges at universities in the United States
 
1905 establishments in Florida
Institutes associated with CERN